Meryl Abeles O'Loughlin (June 8, 1933 – February 27, 2007) was an American television and film casting agent and casting director.

She was born in Chicago, Illinois, and was Jewish.  She held positions as casting supervisor, executive-in-charge of talent, casting consultant, and talent  executive. She was nominated twice for a Casting Society of America Award in 1997 & 1999 for The Young and the Restless.

Her son, Chris O'Loughlin, was a member of the 1992 U.S. Olympic team in épée fencing. She was the former wife of actor Gerald S. O'Loughlin.

Meryl O'Loughlin died from ovarian cancer, aged 73, in Santa Monica, California.

Selected credits
The Outer Limits (as Meryl Abeles)
The Fugitive
The Mary Tyler Moore Show
The Mary Tyler Moore Show
Sham!
Mike Hammer: Murder Me, Murder You
ALF
Hart to Hart
Fantasy Island
Fighting Back: The Story of Rocky Bleier
Hill Street Blues
Lucky/Chances
Alice In Wonderland: Alice Through The Looking Glass
The White Shadow
The Bob Newhart Show
Lou Grant
WKRP in Cincinnati
T.J. Hooker
Tremors II: Aftershocks
The Young and the Restless 
Taylor's Wall

References

External links

1933 births
2007 deaths
Deaths from cancer in California
American casting directors
Women casting directors
Deaths from ovarian cancer
People from Chicago
People from Greater Los Angeles